Frank Leskaj (born April 16, 1971) is an American swimmer who competed for Albania in the 50-meter freestyle, 100-meter freestyle, and the 100-meter breaststroke at the 1992 Summer Olympics. Leskaj was the first Albanian swimmer to compete in the Olympics.

Results

References

External links 
 

1971 births
Albanian male swimmers
American people of Albanian descent
Living people
Olympic swimmers of Albania
Swimmers from Philadelphia
Swimmers at the 1992 Summer Olympics